Haim (  and stylized as HAIM) is an American pop rock band from Los Angeles, California. The band consists of three sisters Este, Danielle and Alana Haim. The group has released an EP, Forever, and three albums Days Are Gone, Something to Tell You, and Women in Music Pt. III, all of which have achieved commercial and critical success. In 2015, they received their first Grammy Awards nomination for Best New Artist and in 2021 became the first all-female rock group to be nominated for album of the year for Women in Music Pt. III. HAIM has received a total of 8 awards from 34 nominations.

Brit Awards
The Brit Awards are the British Phonographic Industry's annual pop music awards. Haim has received three nominations.

GAFFA Awards
The GAFFA Awards (Danish: GAFFA Prisen) have been awarded since 1991 by Danish magazine of the same name in the field of popular music.
{| class="wikitable"
|-
! width="30px"| Year
! Work
! Award
! Result
! Ref.
|-
|rowspan=3|2021
| Haim
| Best International Band
| 
| rowspan=3|
|-
| Women in Music Pt. III
| Best International Album
| 
|-
| "The Steps"
| Best International Hit
|

Grammy Awards
The Grammy Awards is an annual music awards show held by the National Academy of Recording Arts and Sciences of the United States for outstanding achievements in the record industry. Haim have been nominated for four Grammy Awards.

LOS40 Music Awards
LOS40 Music Awards are an annual ceremony by Spanish radio Los 40, regarded as Spain's top music awards today. Haim has received one nomination.

MTV Awards
MTV is an American basic cable and satellite television channel owned by the MTV Networks Music & Logo Group, a unit of the Viacom Media Networks division of Viacom. Haim has received no awards from one nomination.

Music Week Awards
The Music Week Awards are the UK's only music awards that recognise labels, publishing, live, retail, A&R, radio, marketing and PR.

|-
| 2021
| Haim
| PR Campaign
|

NME Awards
The NME Awards is an annual music awards show in the United Kingdom, founded by the music magazine, NME (New Musical Express). Haim has received four awards from ten nominations.

Rober Awards Music Poll
{| class="wikitable"
|-
! width="30px"| Year
! Work
! Award
! Result
! Ref.
|-
| rowspan=2|2013
| Themselves
| Best Pop Artist 
| 
| rowspan=2|
|-
| "Falling" (Duke Dumont Remix)
| Best Dance Anthem
| 
|-
| rowspan=2|2020
| rowspan=2|Themselves
| Best Group or Duo
| 
| rowspan=2|
|-
| Best Rock Artist
|

Sound of...
Sound of... is an annual BBC poll of music critics and industry figures to find the most promising new music talent. Haim has received one award from one nomination.

The Daily Californian Art Awards

!Ref.
|-
| 2020
| Women in Music Pt. III
| Best Pop Album
| 
|

World Music Awards
The World Music Awards is an international awards ceremony that annually honors recording artists based on worldwide sales figures provided by the International Federation of the Phonographic Industry. Haim has received no awards from four nominations.

Notes

References

Awards
Lists of awards received by American musician
Lists of awards received by musical group